The 1994 Romanian Open was an ATP men's tennis tournament held in Bucharest, Romania. It was the second edition of the tournament and was held from 12 September through 19 September 1994.

Unseeded Franco Davín won his first title of the year, and third of his career.

Finals

Singles

 Franco Davín defeated  Goran Ivanišević 6–2, 6–4
 It was Davín's 1st singles title of the year and the 3rd and last of his career.

Doubles

 Wayne Arthurs /  Simon Youl defeated  Jordi Arrese /  José Antonio Conde 6–4, 6–4

References

External links
 ITF tournament edition details
 ATP tournament profile

Romanian Open
Romanian Open
R
September 1994 sports events in Europe